Rynek may refer to the following places:
Rynek, Lesser Poland Voivodeship (south Poland)
Rynek, Masovian Voivodeship (east-central Poland)
Rynek, Subcarpathian Voivodeship (south-east Poland)
Rynek, Warmian-Masurian Voivodeship (north Poland)